This is a list of the Nepal national football team results from 1990 to 2009.

Results

1991

1993

1994

1995

1996

1997

1998

1999

2000

2001

2003

2005

2006

2007

2008

2009

See also
 Nepal national football team (1972–1989)

results
1990s in Nepalese sport